The Wörnitz is a river in Bavaria, Germany, a left tributary of the Danube. Its source is near Schillingsfürst, in the Middle Franconia region of Bavaria. It flows south, through the Nördlinger Ries, and flows into the Danube in Donauwörth. Towns along the Wörnitz include Wörnitz, Dinkelsbühl, Wassertrüdingen, Oettingen, Harburg and Donauwörth.

See also
List of rivers of Bavaria

References

Rivers of Bavaria
Rivers of Germany